Stump Lake National Wildlife Refuge is a National Wildlife Refuge in Nelson County, North Dakota.  It is managed under Devils Lake Wetland Management District.

References
Refuge directory listing

External links
 Stump Lake National Wildlife Refuge - Theodore Roosevelt Center at Dickinson University
 Oh Ranger: Stump Lake National Wildlife Refuge

National Wildlife Refuges in North Dakota
Protected areas of Nelson County, North Dakota